KPCZ-FM (106.7 MHz) is a classic country radio station, branded as "Freedom 106.7, Your Country Legends". Licensed to Rayne, Louisiana, it broadcasts to the central Acadiana area, including Lafayette. The station is owned by Broadcast Partners Inc.  Its studios are in Crowley and the transmitter is located north of Crowley.

The classic country format was introduced on October 6, 2014. KPCZ-FM had previously broadcast a Cajun music format since January 2012, which had in turn replaced an earlier classic country format under the station's previous KLEJ call sign.

On February 28, 2022, KPCZ-FM rebranded as "Freedom 106.7".

Previous logo

References

External links
KPCZ-FM website

PCZ-FM
Radio stations established in 1993
1993 establishments in Louisiana
Classic country radio stations in the United States